Baidyanath Misra (22 November, 1920 – 8 May, 2019) was an Indian economist, educationist, author, and administrator from the state of Odisha. He served as the Vice-Chancellor of the Odisha University of Agriculture and Technology, Deputy-Chairman of Odisha State Planning Board, Chairman of Odisha's First State Finance Commission, Secretary of Odisha State Welfare Board, founder Secretary and President of Orissa Economics Association, and the founder Director and Chairman of Nabakrushna Choudhury Centre for Development Studies. He wrote 16 books in English and 20 in Odia. He was also a columnist in several leading Odia journals and newspapers. He organised several camps across Odisha, for helping the cause of the poor and downtrodden.

Education 
Misra received his Bachelor of Arts degree in economics from Ravenshaw University, followed by a Master of Arts degree from the University of Allahabad, and was the topper at both the institutions. He was also the first Odia topper of the Faculty of Arts and the Department of Economics of Allahabad University. He received two gold medals from Sarojini Naidu (the then ex officio Chancellor of the University of Allahabad, being the Governor of the United Provinces) during the convocation, one each from the Arts faculty and the Economics department. He completed another master's degree in economics from Wharton School of the University of Pennsylvania on a Fulbright Scholarship, where he studied under the Nobel laureate, Simon Kuznets. After returning to India, he did a PhD from Utkal University.

Career 

Having started his career as a lecturer in Ravenshaw College, he moved to Utkal University as a professor and the head of the department of Analytical & Applied Economics, where he instituted two academic chairs, funded by the Reserve Bank of India and the State Bank of India. He served as the Vice-Chancellor of the Odisha University of Agriculture and Technology from 1981 to 1985. During his tenure as the VC of OUAT, he established the College of Engineering and Technology, Bhubaneswar, College of Agriculture, Sambalpur, College of Home Science, Bhubaneswar, and the College of Fisheries, Ganjam. He headed the Odisha State Planning Board from 1985 to 1990. In 1987, he founded the Nabakrushna Choudhury Centre for Development Studies (NCDS), in Bhubaneswar, which is jointly funded by the Indian Council of Social Science Research (ICSSR), Government of India, and the Government of Odisha. He was also a member of the panel of economists of the Planning Commission of India and the Odisha Pay Commission.

Recognition 

He received an honorary doctorate from KIIT University in 2012, for his contributions to Economics. 
The Chief Minister of Odisha, Naveen Patnaik, conferred on  him the Think Odisha Leadership Award in 2010, jointly with the AICTE Chairman and the Director of IIT Kharagpur, Damodar Acharya, for their contributions in the field of education. 
He was also awarded the Odisha Sahitya Academy Award in 1996, for his contributions to Odia literature, in addition to the Nandighosh award and Vishub Milan award.

Family 

He was born to Mahadev Misra and Manika Devi, in Khordha. He was married to Basanti Misra, a homemaker and a post-graduate in arts. The couple's children include a daughter, Bijayalaxmi, who is married to Ajatsatru Tripathy, an ophthalmologist; and three sons, Basant, who did his MS general surgery from Delhi University and MCh in neurosurgery from AIIMS, New Delhi, and is the Chief of Surgery and the Chairman of Neurosurgery at Hinduja Hospitals; Jayant, who did graduation in electrical engineering from IIT Roorkee and MEP from IIM Ahmedabad, and is currently Director & Chief Operating Officer of Indian Metals & Ferro Alloys; and  Sukant, who did post-graduation and doctorate in economics from Utkal University and Mississippi State University, and is currently Dean & Vice-Provost at Texas Technical University.

Legacy 
 The Orissa Economics Association annually organises the Prof. Baidyanath Misra Lecture in his memory.
 His eldest son and a noted neurosurgeon, Basant Misra started the Baidyanath Neurosurgery Charitable Trust, in his honour.

Bibliography

English 
 Economic Profile of India	
 Economic Liberalisation and Regional Disparities in India	
 Economics of Public Finance
 Capitalism, Socialism and Planning
 Development, Deprivation, and Welfare Policy 
 Poverty, Unemployment and Rural Development
 Population Stabilisation and Development	
 Growth and Governance
 Structural Change
 Fiscal Policy in the Context of Planning: An Analysis of Keynesian Economics in Relation to Economic Development
 Reference Orissa: An Indian State of Eastern Region
 Cooperative Movement in India: A Case Study of an Indian State
 Studies in the Economics of Farm Management in Cuttack District, Orissa
 Socialism and Market Economy: Proceedings of Seminar on Socialism and Market Economy
 Agro-industries and Economic Development: A Vision for the 21st Century
 Seminar Papers on Rural Development
 Agricultural Development: Problems and Prospects
 Economic Development of Orissa
 Political Economy of Development
 Strategy of Development Planning
 Contemporary Economic System
 Pursuit of Destiny (Autobiography)

Odia 
 Anucintā	
 Ārthanītikayojanā
 Puñjibāda, sāmyabāda, o Gāndhibāda
 Rāmarājyare aśānti	
 Rājanītira sukha duḥkha	
 Smr̥ti-tīrtha	
 Samāja o sabhyatā
 Sāmājika mūlyabodha

Other publications 
60 Research Papers, 10 Research Reports. He regularly contributed articles to Odia magazines and Odia newspapers.

References 

Ravenshaw University alumni
University of Allahabad alumni
University of Pennsylvania alumni
Wharton School of the University of Pennsylvania alumni
Utkal University alumni
Indian economists
Indian agricultural economists
Indian social scientists
20th-century Indian economists
20th-century Indian social scientists
20th-century Indian educators
Heads of universities and colleges in India
Odisha academics
1920 births
2019 deaths
Writers from Odisha
Odia-language writers
Recipients of the Odisha Sahitya Akademi Award
Academic staff of Utkal University
Fulbright alumni
20th-century Indian male writers